Hrvatski akademski odbojkaški klub Mladost or simply HAOK Mladost is a Croatian professional volleyball team based in Zagreb which is part of the HAŠK Mladost sports society. It was established in 1945. HAOK is the most successful Croatian volleyball team in both the men's and women's selections, as the teams have won over 50 national championships in Yugoslavia and Croatia.

Honours (men's team)
Yugoslav Volleyball Championship
Winners (17): 1948, 1952, 1962, 1963, 1965, 1966, 1968, 1969, 1970, 1971, 1977, 1981, 1982, 1983, 1984, 1985, 1986
Croatian Volleyball League
Winners (20): 1992–93, 1993–94, 1994–95, 1995–96, 1996–97, 1997–98, 1998–99, 1999–2000, 2000–01, 2001–02, 2002–03, 2005–06, 2006–07, 2007–08, 2009–10, 2010–11, 2017–18, 2018–19, 2020–21, 2021–22
Runners-up (10): 2003–04, 2004–05, 2008–09, 2011–12, 2012–13, 2013–14, 2014–15, 2015–16, 2016–17, 2019–20
Yugoslav Volleyball Cup
Winners (8): 1978, 1980, 1981, 1983, 1984, 1985, 1986, 1988
Croatian Volleyball Cup
Winners (22): 1993, 1994, 1995, 1996, 1997, 1998, 2000, 2001, 2002, 2003, 2004, 2005, 2006, 2008, 2009, 2013, 2014, 2015, 2016, 2019, 2020, 2022
Runners-up (1): 2010
Croatian Volleyball Super Cup
Winners (2): 2016, 2017
CEV Champions League
Runners-up (3): 1964, 1984, 1985
CEV Challenge Cup
Runners-up (1): 2010
Interleague
Winners (4): 1995–96, 1996–97, 1997–98, 1998–99
Runners-up (1): 1993–94
MEVZA League
Runners-up (2): 2019–20, 2021–22

Honours (women's team)
Yugoslav Volleyball Championship
Winners (5): 1984, 1987, 1989, 1990, 1991
Croatian Volleyball League
Winners (16): 1992–93, 1993–94, 1994–95, 1995–96, 2001–02, 2002–03, 2003–04, 2004–05, 2005–06, 2013–14, 2015–16, 2017–18, 2018–19, 2019–20, 2020–21, 2021–22
Runners-up (2): 2014–15, 2016–17
Yugoslav Volleyball Cup
Winners (7): 1981, 1984, 1985, 1986, 1988, 1989, 1990
Croatian Volleyball Cup
Winners (11): 1993, 1994, 1995, 2002, 2004, 2014, 2015, 2018, 2019, 2020, 2021
Runners-up (3): 2001, 2006, 2009
Croatian Volleyball Super Cup
Runners-up (1): 2016
Women's CEV Champions League
Winners (1): 1991
Runners-up (2): 1992, 1994
Interleague
Winners (1): 1993–94

References

External links
Official website 

Croatian volleyball clubs
Sports teams in Zagreb
Volleyball clubs established in 1945
1945 establishments in Croatia